Zahniser is a surname. Notable people with the surname include:

Howard Zahniser (1906–1964), American environmental activist
Nancy Zahniser (1948–2016), American pharmacologist
Paul Zahniser (1896–1964), American baseball pitcher